= Oxford Dictionary of Biology =

Multiple-editions biology dictionary

- Cover of the seventh edition
- Author: Robert Hine; Elizabeth Martin
- Language: English
- Subject: Biology
- Published: 2015 (Oxford University Press)
- Publication place: United Kingdom
- Media type: Print (hardcover and paperback)
- Pages: 736
- ISBN: 978-0-19-871437-8

Oxford Dictionary of Biology (often abbreviated to ODB) is a multiple editions dictionary published by the English Oxford University Press. With more than 5,500 entries, it contains comprehensive information in English on topics relating to biology, biophysics, and biochemistry. The first edition was published in 1985 as A Concise Dictionary of Biology. The seventh edition, A Dictionary of Biology, was published in 2015 and it was edited by Robert Hine and Elizabeth Martin.

Robert Hine studied at King's College London and University of Aberdeen and since 1984 he has contributed to numerous journals and books.

== Digital and on-line availability ==
The sixth and seventh editions of the ODB are available online for members of subscribed institutions and for subscribed individuals via Oxford Reference.

== Editions ==
The first edition of Oxford Dictionary of Biology was first published in 1985 and the seventh edition in 2015.

Year	Edition
1985	First edition
1990	Second edition
1996	Third edition
2000	Fourth edition
2004	Fifth edition
2008	Sixth edition
2015	Seventh edition
2019	Eighth edition
